Stewartsville is an unincorporated community in Belmont County, in the U.S. state of Ohio.

History
A post office called Stewartsville was established in 1873, and remained in operation until 1998. The community was named for John Stewart, a businessperson in the local mining industry.

Notable people
 Sam Jones, Major League Baseball pitcher
 Shag Thomas, professional wrestler, champion

References

Unincorporated communities in Belmont County, Ohio
1873 establishments in Ohio
Populated places established in 1873
Unincorporated communities in Ohio